Sultan of Terengganu is the title of the constitutional head of Terengganu state in Malaysia. The current Sultan Mizan Zainal Abidin of Terengganu, is the 18th sultan and 13th Yang di-Pertuan Agong of Malaysia from 2006 to 2011. He is the head of the religion of Islam in the state and the source of all titles, honours and dignities in the state.

History 
Terengganu emerged as an independent sultanate in 1725. The first sultan was Zainal Abidin I, the younger brother of a former sultan of Johor, and Johor strongly influenced Terengganu politics through the 18th century. However, in the book Tuhfat al-Nafis, the author, Raja Ali Haji, mentions that in the year 1708, Zainal Abidin I was installed as the Sultan of Terengganu by Daeng Menampuk – also known as Raja Tua – under the rule of Sultan Sulaiman Badrul Alam Shah.

In the 19th century, Terengganu became a vassal state of the Thai Rattanakosin Kingdom, and sent tribute every year called bunga mas. This occurred under the reign of Sultan Omar Riayat Shah, who was remembered as a devout ruler who promoted trade and stable government. Under Thai rule, Terengganu prospered, and was largely left alone by the authorities in Bangkok. The period also witnessed the existence of a Terengganuan vassal of Besut Darul Iman.

Sultan Zainal Abidin III succeeded the death of his father Sultan Ahmad II in 1881, under his reign Terengganu became a British protectorate under the Anglo-Siamese Treaty of 1909. In 1911, the sultan issued Terengganu's first constitution. In 1919, a British advisor was appointed to Sultan Muhammad Shah II, the son of the former sultan. Sultan Sulaiman Badrul Alam Shah was crowned on 1920, his reign saw the growth of Malay nationalism in Terengganu. During the 1920s, growing anti-British sentiment in Terengganu led to uprisings in 1922, 1925 and 1928 which were led by Haji Abdul Rahman Limbong. Sultan Sulaiman Badrul Alam Shah of Terengganu died on 25 September 1942 of blood poisoning. The Japanese Military Administration, which occupied Malaya at that time, proclaimed his son as the 15th Sultan of Terengganu bearing the title Sultan Ali Shah. However, on 1943, the Thai government under prime minister Field Marshal Plaek Pibulsonggram took over the administration of Terengganu from the Japanese and continued to recognise Sultan Ali Shah.

When the British returned after the end of World War II, they declined to recognise Sultan Ali Shah. Allegedly, Sultan Ali was too much in debt and had been too close to the Japanese during their occupation. According to Sultan Ali, the British Military Administration wanted him removed for his refusal to sign the Malayan Union treaty and they also disapproved of his character.

On 1945, the Terengganu State Council of thirteen members announced the dismissal of Sultan Ali and the appointment of Tengku Ismail as the 16th Sultan of Terengganu. Tengku Ismail became known as Sultan Ismail Nasiruddin Shah and was installed on 6 June 1949 at Istana Maziah, Kuala Terengganu. Sultan Ali continued to dispute his dismissal until his death on 17 May 1996.

Sultan Mahmud al-Muktafi Billah Shah succeeded his father in 1979 and ruled Terengganu until 1989 where it then passed to his son, Sultan Zainal Abidin in 1998. He is the current sultan to this day.

List of sultans

1725–1733: Zainal Abidin I
1733–1793: Mansur Shah I
1793–1808: Zainal Abidin II
1808–1830: Ahmad Shah I
1830–1831: Abdul Rahman
1831 (jointly): Omar Riayat Shah and Mansur Shah II
1831–1837: Mansur Shah II
1837–1839: Muhammad Shah I
1839–1876: Omar Riayat Shah
1876-1877: Mahmud Mustafa Shah
1876–1881: Ahmad Shah II
1881–1918: Zainal Abidin III
1918–1920: Muhammad Shah II
1920–1942: Sulaiman Badrul Alam Shah
1942–1945: Ali Shah
1945–1979: Ismail Nasiruddin Shah
1979–1998: Mahmud al-Muktafi Billah Shah
1998–present: Mizan Zainal Abidin

Gallery

See also 
Family tree of Terengganu monarchs
Family tree of Malaysian monarchs
List of Sunni Muslim dynasties

References

 
1725 establishments in the British Empire
House of Bendahara of Johor
1725 establishments in Asia
Terengganu